Agriculture is the largest employment sector in Bangladesh, making up 14.2 percent of Bangladesh's GDP in 2017 and employing about 42.7 percent of the workforce.  The performance of this sector has an overwhelming impact on major macroeconomic objectives like employment generation, poverty alleviation, human resources development, food security, and other economic and social forces. A plurality of Bangladeshis earn their living from agriculture. Due to a number of factors, Bangladesh's labour-intensive agriculture has achieved steady increases in food grain production despite the often unfavorable weather conditions. These include better flood control and irrigation, a generally more efficient use of fertilisers, as well as the establishment of better distribution and rural credit networks.

Although rice and jute are the primary crops, maize and vegetables are assuming greater importance. Due to the expansion of irrigation networks, some wheat producers have switched to cultivation of maize which is used mostly as poultry feed. Tea is grown in the northeast. Because of Bangladesh's fertile soil and normally ample water supply, rice can be grown and harvested three times a year in many areas. The country is among the top producers of rice (third), potatoes (seventh), tropical fruits (sixth), jute (second), and farmed fish (fifth). With 35.8 million metric tons produced in 2000, rice is Bangladesh's principal crop.

Population pressure continues to place a severe burden on productive capacity, creating a food deficit, especially of wheat. Foreign assistance and commercial imports fill the gap. Underemployment remains a serious problem, and a growing concern for Bangladesh's agricultural sector will be its ability to absorb additional manpower. Finding alternative sources of employment will continue to be a daunting problem for future governments, particularly with the increasing numbers of landless peasants who already account for about half the rural labour force. Other challenges facing the sector include environmental issues: insecticides, water management challenges, pollution, and land degradation all effect the agricultural system in Bangladesh.  Bangladesh is particularly vulnerable to climate change, with extreme weather and temperature changes significantly changing the conditions for growing food. Adaptation of the agricultural sector is a major concern for policy addressing climate change in Bangladesh.

Food crops

Although rice, wheat, mango and jute are the primary crops, rice and wheat are mostly main crops or food crops of some countries. Due to the expansion of irrigation networks, some wheat producers have switched to cultivation of maize which is used mostly as poultry feed. Tea is grown in the northeast. Because of Bangladesh's fertile soil and normally ample water supply, rice can be grown and harvested three times a year in many areas. Due to a number of factors, Bangladesh's labour-intensive agriculture has achieved steady increases in food grain production despite the often unfavorable weather conditions. These include better flood control and irrigation, a generally more efficient use of fertilizers, and the establishment of better distribution and rural credit networks. With 28.8 million metric tons produced in 2005–2006 (July–June), rice is Bangladesh's principal crop. By comparison, wheat output in 2005–2006 was 9 million metric tons. Population pressure continues to place a severe burden on productive capacity, creating a food deficit, especially of wheat. Foreign assistance and commercial imports fill the gap. Underemployment remains a serious problem, and a growing concern for Bangladesh's agricultural sector will be its ability to absorb additional manpower.

Food grains are cultivated primarily for subsistence. Only a small percentage of total production makes its way into commercial channels. Other Bangladeshi food crops, however, are grown chiefly for the domestic market. They include potatoes and sweet potatoes, with a combined record production of 1.9 million tons in FY 1984; oilseeds, with an annual average production of 250,000 tons; and fruits such as bananas, jackfruit, mangoes, and pineapples. Estimates of sugarcane production put annual production at more than 7 million tons per year, most of it processed into a coarse, unrefined sugar known as gur, and sold domestically.

Rice 

Bangladesh is the fourth largest rice producing country in the world. National sales of the classes of insecticide used on rice, including granular carbofuran, synthetic pyrethroids, and malathion exceeded 13,000 tons of formulated product in 2003. The insecticides not only represent an environmental threat, but are a significant expenditure to poor rice farmers.  The Bangladesh Rice Research Institute is working with various NGOs and international organisations to reduce insecticide use in rice.

Wheat 
Wheat is not a traditional crop in Bangladesh, and in the late 1980s little was consumed in rural areas. During the 1960s and early 1970s, however, it was the only commodity for which local consumption increased because external food aid was most often provided in the form of wheat. In the first half of the 1980s, domestic wheat production rose to more than 1 million tons per year but was still only 7 to 9 percent of total food grain production. Record production of nearly 1.5 million tons was achieved in FY 1985, but the following year saw a decrease to just over 1 million tons. About half the wheat is grown on irrigated land. The proportion of land devoted to wheat remained essentially unchanged between 1980 and 1986, at a little less than 6 percent of total planted area.

Wheat also accounts for the great bulk of imported food grains, exceeding 1 million tons annually and going higher than 1.8 million tons in FY 1984, FY 1985, and FY 1987. The great bulk of the imported wheat is financed under aid programs of the United States, the European Economic Community.

Animal agriculture

Poultry

Shrimp

Commodity crops

Tea

Environmental issues

Insecticides 
National sales of the classes of insecticide used on rice, including granular carbofuran, synthetic pyrethroids, and malathion exceeded 13,000 tons of formulated product in 2003.  Insecticides not only represent an environmental threat, but are a significant expenditure to poor rice farmers.  The Bangladesh Rice Research Institute is working with various NGOs and international organisations to reduce insecticide use in rice.

Climate change

Government

Ministry of Agriculture

See also
 Poultry farming In Bangladesh
 Forestry in Bangladesh
 Fishing in Bangladesh
 Economy of Bangladesh

References